The World Series of Poker Circuit is a series of poker tournaments held annually at a variety of casinos since 2005 as a build-up to the World Series of Poker (WSOP).

All Championship events are competed in no limit Texas hold 'em; preliminary events may be different poker variants.

In 2015, the WSOP International Circuit was launched, with rounds in Canada, Latin America, the Caribbean, Europe, Asia-Pacific and Africa. The International Circuit has expanded to 13 tournaments for the 2017/18 season.

WSOP Circuit bracelets

WSOP Circuit National Championship
Starting in 2010–11, the WSOP Circuit National Championship was held as a closed event for participants of various circuit events. The winner of the WSOP Circuit National Championship won a World Series of Poker bracelet.

Starting in 2011–12, qualification for the WSOP Circuit National Championship was significantly changed. A total of 100 players now receive automatic seats in the WSOP Circuit National Championship. The winners of each Circuit main event and the highest point earner at each circuit stop receive seats, with the remaining automatic seats filled by the top points earners throughout the Circuit season who are not already qualified. Additionally, the top 100 players in the "WSOP World Rankings", a points race determined on results in open events of the previous two WSOPs, are eligible to enter. The Circuit qualifiers play the National Championship on a freeroll, while the WSOP World Rankings qualifiers must pay a $10,000 buy-in.

WSOP Global Casino Championship
 
In 2015–16, the WSOP National Championship was renamed to the WSOP Global Casino Championship, featuring the winners from both WSOP Circuit and WSOP International Circuit. The winner of the WSOP Global Casino Championship won a World Series of Poker bracelet.

WSOP Tournament of Champions

WSOP Circuit rings

Like the World Series of Poker and its prestigious bracelet, all circuit stops have preliminary events that award rings as well.

In March 2018, WSOP.com in New Jersey hosted the first online poker tournament to award a Circuit ring.

WSOP Circuit ring winners
Below is a list of all poker players who have won at least five World Series of Poker (WSOP) Circuit rings.

Information correct as of 21 November 2021.

Most WSOP Circuit Rings in Shortest Period of Time 
In July 2022, Sergio Ramirez became the first player to win 4 WSOP Circuit rings in 12 days: $500 PLO WSOPC Online (July 15), $600 PLO WSOPC Choctaw (July 19), $400 NLHE WSOPC Choctaw (July 25), and $400 NLHE WSOPC Choctaw (July 26)

WSOP Circuit Main Event Winners

The World Series of Poker Circuit now has 22 stops along the national tour.  Each stop ends with a $1,675 buy-in Main Event.  Originally they were $10,000.  However, it changed rapidly with each succeeding WSOP Circuit season.

2005 season

2005–06 season

2006–07 season

2007–08 season

2008–09 season

2009–10 season

2010–11 season

2011–12 season

2012–13 season

2013–14 season

2014–15 season

2015–16 season

2016–17 season

2017–18 season

2018–19 season

2019–20 season

2020–21 season
This season was not held due to the ongoing situation surrounding the COVID-19 pandemic.

2021–22 season
Spencer Smith won back-to-back Monster Stack rings in Cherokee, NC both in 2200+ entry fields, for a total of $205,000.

References

 
World Series of Poker